New Market Gap is a wind gap in the Massanutten Mountain in Virginia.    The  gap is located approximately in the middle of the range, dividing it into north and south sections.

U.S. Route 211 runs through the gap, connecting New Market in the Shenandoah Valley with Luray in the Page Valley.  The Massanutten Visitor Center of the George Washington National Forest is off Rt. 211 in the gap.

References

Wind gaps of Virginia
Landforms of Page County, Virginia
Landforms of Shenandoah County, Virginia